Bosko the Musketeer is an American animated short film. It is a Looney Tunes cartoon, featuring Bosko, the first star of the series. It was released on August 12, 1933, although some sources note September 16 as a date; this is problematic, as that would imply that the last films featuring Bosko as the star of Warner Bros. cartoons were released after the first film featuring Buddy, the second star of the series. It was, like most Looney Tunes of the time, directed by Hugh Harman; Frank Marsales was the musical director.

Summary
Bosko and Bruno are merrily skipping through a field of flowers, as Bosko sings; we come to Honey, who is happily dusting her home, as well as her pet fish. As she dusts a large, framed photograph of Bosko, she segues into a sultry impression of Mae West. Bosko walks in just as Honey is dusting a painting of "The Three Musketeers"; she rhetorically asks Bosko's opinion on their grandeur, to which Bosko replies, "Shucks, that's nothin'!" He pulls an umbrella out of a container by Honey's door, and begins to mime the moves of a skilled fencer; as Honey sings, we transition to an imaginary scene in which Bosko, now cheerfully brandishing a real foil, fights off a horde of enemies, first by swordplay, then finally by unleashing the tap of a nearby keg. He walks into a saloon and greets its patrons as the screen fades to a title, "The Three Musketeers".

The Three Musketeers stand about, singing of their identities; Bosko leaps upon a table to introduce them, "Athos, Amos, and Andy!" "One for all!" cries Bosko; "And all for one!" the musketeers reply. Bosko rushes off to an overturned table, on whose leg he dashes his foil, such that it coils about the wooden leg and forms a corkscrew; he then uncorks a bottle marked "New Deal '32" and pours it, as his companions continue to sing. As they finish, Bosko pours the drink down the gullet of Athos; it is tasted, apparently, by Amos; and the effects of the intoxicating beverage are felt by Andy. Those gathered in the drinking spot cheer, except for one patron, who exhibits his dislike of the performance, and proceeds to eat an entire roast chicken in but two bites: he then uncorks a beer bottle with the teeth of another patron seated at a table beside his own.

Fanfare! At a newly opened door, and to great applause, appears Honey, who declares "Here I am, you lucky people!" She dances; Bosko, to an elderly patron, declares "Ain't she keen?!" and slaps the old-timer on the back, only to release the gentleman's false teeth. The gluttonous patron from before takes note of Honey, and pulls her over to his leg; she struggles futilely, and calls for Bosko's assistance. Bosko springs into action; Honey escapes once the cur notes his challenger. "You viper!" Bosko cries. The villain draws his sword, Bosko his, and as they begin to duel, the spontaneously animated swords shake hands as if to signal the start of the fight. The villain clearly has the upper hand, especially when he stabs the feather on Bosko's hat and the poor thing turns out to be a live bird, which flies away! Bosko continues to fight the cur, but breaks the cur's sword against his after the other half of the cur's sword is broken and lands in the floor, leading him to call for a caddy, who carries with him a number of foils, and on whose long beard the villain whets his new blade. Bosko chooses to refine his weapon with a pencil sharpener, as the foil was blunted in the last exchange. The villain takes a coat hanger and uses it as a bow, by which he fires his sword like an arrow; it misses Bosko, but strips the skirt of a lady's dress to reveal a hen and her chicks beneath the crinoline's frame.

The fight ends when Bosko, pushed up against a fireplace, steps on a stoker, flipping a number of coals over his head and that of his foe, and into the seat of the villain's pants: the cur runs off yelping in pain. We return to Bosko and Honey, in Honey's home, where she teasingly declares that she does not believe Bosko's yarn!

Modern references
In the 1990 Tiny Toon Adventures episode "Fields of Honey", in which Babs Bunny discovers the all-but-forgotten cartoons starring Honey (whom she adopts as a mentor) and Bosko, Honey's catchphrase appears to be "Here I am, you lucky people!", which phrase she actually utters in Bosko the Musketeer.

References

External links
 http://www.youtube.com/watch?v=43exB0ewmsA
 

1933 films
1933 animated films
American black-and-white films
Films scored by Frank Marsales
Films based on The Three Musketeers
Films directed by Hugh Harman
Bosko films
Looney Tunes shorts
Warner Bros. Cartoons animated short films
1930s Warner Bros. animated short films